The following is a list of Jacksonville State Gamecocks men's basketball head coaches. There have been 11 head coaches of the Dolphins in their 94-season history.

Jacksonville State's current head coach is Ray Harper. He was hired as the Gamecocks' head coach in April 2016, replacing James Green, departed after the 2015–16 season.

References

Jacksonville State

Jacksonville State Gamecocks basketball, men's, coaches